Steele Creek is a census-designated place (CDP) in Fairbanks North Star Borough, Alaska, United States. It is part of the Fairbanks, Alaska Metropolitan Statistical Area. As of the 2020 census, the population was 6,437, down from 6,662 in 2010. It is the eighth-most populated CDP in Alaska.

Geography
Steele Creek is located northeast of Fairbanks and east of the Steese Highway. The community is named for the creek which flows from north to south across the western part of the CDP, rising on Tungsten Hill and flowing towards the Chena River. The CDP extends east as far as the Little Chena River and Iowa Creek. The CDP is bounded by Two Rivers to the east, Badger to the south, Fairbanks to the southwest, Farmers Loop to the west, and Fox to the northwest.

Demographics

As of the census of 2010, there were 6,662 people, 2,525 households, and 1,806 families residing in the CDP. There were 2,743 housing units. The racial makeup of the CDP was 87.4% White, 0.8% Black or African American, 3.8% Native American, 0.9% Asian, 0.2% Pacific Islander, 1.1% from other races, and 5.9% from two or more races.  3.2% of the population were Hispanic or Latino of any race.

See also 
 Meadow Lakes, Alaska
 Goldstream, Alaska

References

Census-designated places in Alaska
Census-designated places in Fairbanks North Star Borough, Alaska